Vesly is a commune in the Manche department in Normandy in north-western France. It has a population of approximately 600 people. (651 in 2009 study)

It is located on the Cotentin Peninsula, about 6 km from the sea, 44 km south of Cherbourg and 83 km west of Caen.

In 1972 the commune of Gerville-la-Forêt was consolidated into Vesly as an associated commune.

Notable people
 Charles-Alexis-Adrien Duhérissier de Gerville - historian, naturalist and archaeologist, born in Gerville-la-Forêt

See also
Communes of the Manche department

References

Communes of Manche